The Boise State Broncos men's basketball team represents Boise State University in the Mountain West Conference. The Broncos are led by head coach Leon Rice, hired in March 2010, and play their home games on campus at ExtraMile Arena in Boise, Idaho.  BSU's most recent appearance in the NCAA tournament was in 2022 where the team finished ranked #23 in the AP/Coaches polls.

History

Greg Graham era
Athletic director Gene Bleymaier hired Greg Graham to be head coach in 2002. In eight seasons, Graham had a 142–112 record at Boise State and led Boise State to a berth in the 2004 NIT, 2008 NCAA tournament and 2009 CBI. For leading Boise State to the NCAA tournament, the Western Athletic Conference named Graham "Coach of the Year" in 2008.

In 2010, after a 15–17 season, Bleymaier fired Graham and stated: "We appreciate everything that Coach Graham and his staff have contributed to Boise State the past eight years. We felt that in the best interest of the program we needed to make a change."

Leon Rice era
Leon Rice replaced Graham as head coach of the Broncos on March 26, 2010. In his first season as head coach, he led Boise State to the finals of the 2011 WAC men's basketball tournament and to the semifinals of the 2011 College Basketball Invitational. He is the first Boise State head coach to win 20 games in two of his first three seasons and has 20 or more wins in eight of his ten seasons. In 2013, he guided the Broncos to their first ever at-large bid to the NCAA tournament. In 2015, he led the Broncos to their first ever Mountain West regular season championship, and first conference title for Boise State since 2008, and was named the Mountain West coach of the year. On February 13, 2021, Rice won his 214th game to become the winningest head coach in Boise State history. In 2022, Leon Rice led Boise to arguably their best season in school history. The Broncos won a program high 27 games, 15 conference games, the Mountain West conference regular season championship, Mountain West conference tournament, an 8-seed in the NCAA tournament and the highest AP ranking in program history at 23.

In-season tournament championships
1984–85 Gem State Classic (wins over Northwest Nazarene, Idaho State)
1986–87 Real Dairy Classic (wins over College of Idaho, Idaho State)
1986–87 Albertson's Holiday Classic (wins over Southwest Texas State, San Diego)
1987–88 Real Dairy Classic (wins over Lewis-Clark State, Idaho State)
1987–88 Albertson's Holiday Classic (wins over Sam Houston State, St. Mary's (CA))
1988–89 Real Dairy Classic (wins over Northwest Nazarene, Idaho State)
1988–89 Albertson's Holiday Classic (wins over Portland, Wisconsin–Green Bay)
1990–91 Real Dairy Classic (wins over Valparaiso, Idaho State)
1990–91 Albertson's Holiday Classic (wins over Monmouth, Georgia Southern)
1991–92 Real Dairy Classic (wins over Sacramento State, Stephen F. Austin State)
1991–92 Albertson's Holiday Classic (wins over Air Force, Western Michigan)
1992–93 Real Dairy Classic (wins over Elizabeth City State, Georgia State)
1992–93 Albertson's Holiday Classic (wins over George Mason,  Southern Utah)
1993–94 Real Dairy Classic (wins over Siena, Illinois–Chicago)
1994–95 Albertson's Holiday Classic (wins over Bucknell, Davidson)
1996–97 Albertson's Holiday Classic (wins over Campbell, Gonzaga)

Regular season conference titles
 Big Sky (3): 1976, 1988, 1989
 Big West (1): 1999 (East)
 Western Athletic (1): 2008
 Mountain West (2): 2015, 2022

Conference tournament championships
Big Sky (4): 1976, 1988, 1993, 1994
Western Athletic (1): 2008
Mountain West (1): 2022

Conference Player of the Year awards
 Big Sky (2): Arnell Jones (1988), Chris Childs (1989)
 Big West (1): Roberto Bergersen (1999)
 Mountain West (1): Derrick Marks (2015)

Postseason results

NCAA Division I Tournament results
The Broncos have appeared in nine NCAA Division I Tournaments, with a combined record of 0–9. Their first five bids came via conference tournament championships, the first four in the Big Sky. The bid to the First Four in 2013 was the first at-large bid in program history, and they received a second in 2015. BSU made their eighth appearance in 2022 and returned the following year.

NCAA Division II Tournament results
The Broncos appeared in one NCAA Division II tournament (referred to at the time as the College Division), with a 1–1 record.

NIT results
The Broncos have appeared in seven  National Invitational Tournaments (NIT), with a combined record of 5–7.

CBI results
The Broncos have appeared in two College Basketball Invitationals (CBI), with a combined record of 2–2.

Notable alumni   
Gus Johnson – F/C, 1961–1962, Baltimore Bullets, Phoenix Suns, Indiana Pacers. Five time NBA All-Star. Two-time NBA All-Defensive First Team. ABA Champion. #25 retired by the Washington Wizards. Inducted posthumously into the Naismith Memorial Basketball Hall of Fame in 2010. Played sophomore season at Boise Junior College and junior season at the University of Idaho, then was selected tenth overall in the 1963 NBA draft.
 Clyde Dickey – G, 1970–1973. Drafted by the Phoenix Suns. Played for the Utah Stars of the ABA.
Trent Johnson – F, 1974–1978. Johnson is the former head coach of Stanford, Nevada, LSU, and TCU.
Fred Williams – G, 1977–1979. Head coach for the Tulsa Shock of the WNBA. Former head coach of the Atlanta Dream of the WNBA. Williams was an assistant coach for the USC women's basketball team when they won national championships in 1983 and 1984
Bruce Bolden – F, 1981–1985, NBL Grand Final Most Valuable Player in 1992
Terry Lee – G, 1982–1983, Won a World Series Championship with the Cincinnati Reds in 1990
Chris Childs – G, 1985–1989, New Jersey Nets, New York Knicks, Toronto Raptors
Frank Robinson – G, 1989–1990, played for the Denver Broncos of the NFL
Vince Hizon – G/F, 1990–1991, multiple champion in the professional basketball league in the Philippines. Currently the commissioner of the Filsports Basketball Association in the Philippines.
Tanoka Beard – F/C, 1989–1993, 2-time Spanish League MVP (Real Madrid) (all-time Boise State leading scorer 1944 points)
John Coker – C, 1993–1996, Phoenix Suns
Roberto Bergersen – G/F, 1996–1999, drafted by the Atlanta Hawks, traded to the Portland Trail Blazers, won the NBA Development League Championship with the Idaho Stampede in 2008. Number retired by The Idaho Stampede. Current assistant coach for Boise State Broncos men's basketball team.
Jeb Putzier – F, 1999, played on the Bronco basketball team in his sophomore year. Played in NFL for the Denver Broncos, Houston Texans, and Seattle Seahawks.
Bryan Defares – G, 2000–2004, won the California state basketball championship in 2000, helped lead the Broncos the 2004 NIT Sweet Sixteen, played professionally in Europe, and represented the Netherlands national basketball team for 10 years.
Jason Ellis, F/C, 2001–2004, Helped lead the Broncos to the 2004 NIT Sweet Sixteen. NBA G-League Champion, Dutch Basketball League Champion.
Jermaine Blackburn – G/F, 2003–2005, One of the few people in the history of professional basketball to record a Quadruple-double when he tallied 20 points, 10 rebounds, 14 assists, and 10 steals in a CBA game. He followed this performance with a triple-double in his very next game, recording 22 points, 10 rebounds and 13 assists against the same team 
Tyler Tiedeman – F, 2005–2008, Dutch Basketball League All-Star.
Coby Karl – G/F, 2004–2007, Karl is the head coach of the NBA G League's Delaware Blue Coats. He played for Los Angeles Lakers, Cleveland Cavaliers, and the Golden State Warriors in the NBA. Former Head Coach of the NBA G League's South Bay Lakers.
Matt Bauscher – G, 2005–2008, Dutch Basketball League Champion, All-Star, and MVP.
La'Shard Anderson – G, 2008–2011, Anderson has played in the Belgian, Tunisian, Austrian, and Dutch pro leagues.
Robert Arnold – G/F, 2009–2011, played in France's LBN Pro A League.  Finnish League MVP (2015), Finnish League champion (2015), Finnish League scoring champion (2015), 2x Austrian Cup champion (2011, 2012), Austrian Supercup champion (2011).
Mark Sanchez – F, 2007–2009, 2008 Western Athletic Conference tournament champion. Leading scorer and rebounder for the Broncos his senior year. The 2014 Austrian League MVP. Austrian Cup and Dutch Cup Champion.
Anthony Drmic – G/F, 2011–2016, Won the 2016–17 NBL Rookie of the Year Award in Australia's National Basketball League for the Adelaide 36ers. Second place in Boise State University's all-time scoring list after Tanoka Beard.
James Webb III – F, 2014–2016, First Bronco basketball player to declare early for the NBA draft. Brooklyn Nets signed him to a two-way deal on January 15, 2018. Webb was selected to the USA Basketball team in order to represent the country in the 2022 FIBA AmeriCup qualification tournament. Plays for Valencia Basket of Liga ACB and the EuroLeague.
Chandler Hutchison – G/F, 2014–2018, Selected as the No. 22 pick in the first round of the 2018 NBA draft by the Chicago Bulls. He is Boise State's first ever first round pick.
Justinian Jessup – G/F, 2016–2020, Selected as the No. 51 pick in the second round of the 2020 NBA draft by the Golden State Warriors. Before he got drafted Jessup was signed by the Illawarra Hawks of Australia's National Basketball League via their Next Stars program to help him prepare for the NBA draft. Plays for Basket Zaragoza of Liga ACB.
Derrick Alston Jr., F, 2016–2021, Son of Derrick Alston. Plays for the Rostock Seawolves of Basketball Bundesliga.
Abu Kigab, F, 2019–2022, Led Canada to the 2017 FIBA Under-19 Basketball World Cup Championship.  Led Boise State to the Mountain West Conference outright Basketball regular season championship and the Mountain West Conference tournament championship his senior year.  Named the Mountain West Conference tournament MVP his senior year. Played for the Toronto Raptors' NBA Summer League Team.

References

External links

 
Basketball teams established in 1968